Danygraig Halt railway station served the suburb of Dan-y-graig, in the historical county of Glamorganshire, Wales, from 1895 to 1936 on the Rhondda and Swansea Bay Railway.

History 
The station was opened on 14 May 1895 by the Rhondda and Swansea Bay Railway. It was resited to the east on 7 May 1899 when the line was extended to Swansea. It was resited again onto the GWR line on 11 September 1933 and its name was changed to Danygraig Halt. It closed on 28 September 1936.

References 

Disused railway stations in Swansea
Railway stations in Great Britain opened in 1895
Railway stations in Great Britain closed in 1936
1895 establishments in Wales
1936 disestablishments in Wales
Former Great Western Railway stations